Ibrahim Boughali (Arabic: ابراهيم بوغالي) is an Algerian politician who is currently serving as the assembly president of Algeria. On 8 July 2021 he became the president of the country's People's National Assembly.

Career and achievements 
He holds a degree in political science and international relations from the University of Algiers, and got promotion 1986. He has held several positions:

Head of agency at CNEP and researcher at the Al Baraka bank.
Chairman of the agriculture commission at the People's Assembly of the wilaya (APW) of Ghardaïa (2017/2020).
President of the APW of Ghardaïa.

He is considered to be one of the architects of reconciliation during the events of Ghardaïa.

He was elected on July 8, 2021 as the President of the National People's Congress for five years.

Personal life
Ibrahim Boughali is married and is the father of four children.

References 

Members of the People's National Assembly
Living people
Algerian politicians
1963 births